The Paraborne Backplane is an American paramotor that was designed by Scott Alan and produced by Paraborne Aviation of Kissimmee, Florida for powered paragliding.

Design and development
As production of the Daiichi Kosho Whisper, for which Paraborne acted as US distributor, came to a close, the company developed its own derivative design, replacing the Daiichi Kosho DK 472 engine with a Hirth powerplant of similar output.

The Backplane was designed to comply with the US FAR 103 Ultralight Vehicles rules. It features a paraglider-style high wing, single-place accommodation and a single  Hirth F-33 engine in pusher configuration. Original factory canopy options included the Ranger or the Seal designs. As is the case with all paramotors, takeoff and landing is accomplished on foot.

The aircraft was not a commercial success, production was halted and the company went out of business in about 2004.

Specifications (Backplane)

References

1990s United States ultralight aircraft
Single-engined pusher aircraft
Paramotors